Ivan Yevgenyevich Melnik (born 29 July 1991) is a former Russian football forward.

Club career
He made his debut in the Russian Football National League for FC Ural Yekaterinburg on 9 July 2012 in a game against FC Petrotrest St. Petersburg. Overall, he played all 3 seasons of his pro career in the FNL.

References

External links
 
 Profile by Sportbox

1991 births
People from Akmola Region
Living people
Russian footballers
Association football midfielders
FC Ural Yekaterinburg players
FC Dynamo Saint Petersburg players
FC Khimik Dzerzhinsk players